Abu Musab al-Barnawi, born Habib Yusuf, is or was a Nigerian Islamic militant who served as the leader of the Islamic State's branch in West Africa (ISWAP) between August 2016 and March 2019, and again around May 2021. He also served in various other capacities within ISWAP such as head of its shura. Before pledging allegiance to IS, al-Barnawi was the spokesperson for Boko Haram. Multiple sources reported that al-Barnawi was killed in 2021, but later research by the Crisis Group and Humangle Media suggested that these claims were inaccurate.

Early life and Boko Haram membership 
Abu Musab al-Barnawi was the eldest surviving son of the founder of Boko Haram, Mohammed Yusuf. In 2009, Mohammed Yusuf launched a failed uprising; he was captured and killed in police custody. His militant group subsequently fell under the command of Abubakar Shekau. Abu Musab al-Barnawi became Boko Haram's spokesperson.

However, Abu Musab was more moderate than Shekau, disagreeing with the latter's use of women and children as suicide bombers. The two frequently clashed, and Abu Musab even temporarily defected to Ansaru, a Boko Haram splinter group, in 2013. On 27 January 2015, he released a propaganda video for Boko Haram, having rejoined the group.

Islamic State
On 7 March 2015, Abubakar Shekau released an audio message in which he pledged allegiance to Abu Bakr al-Baghdadi and the Islamic State. Abubakar Shekau was reaffirmed as the leader of the branch in an IS video released in April 2016. Despite this, unrest among his forces caused a large force of dissidents, led by Abu Musab al-Barnawi and his stepfather Mamman Nur, to break off and relocate to Lake Chad. On 21 June 2016, Reuters reported Marine Lieutenant General Thomas Waldhauser as saying "Several months ago, about half of Boko Haram broke off to a separate group because they were not happy with the amount of buy-in, if you will, from Boko Haram into the IS brand," Shekau ignored IS orders to stop using children as suicide bombers. "He's been told by ISIL to stop doing that. But he has not done so. And that's one of the reasons why this splinter group has broken off," he said, adding Islamic State was trying to "reconcile those two groups." However, the fracture ultimately resulted in the reemergence of a separate faction, generally called "Boko Haram", led by Shekau, and opposed to IS and ISWAP. The Islamic State central initially continued its attempts to reconcile the infighting factions, to no avail.

On 3 August 2016, the Islamic State reported in the 41st issue of its newspaper al-Naba, that Abu Musab al-Barnawi had been appointed  the new leader of their West African branch. In response, Shekau declared that he and his followers were in the right, and that "[they] will not accept any emissary except the one we can attest he is sincere and truthful for Allah and His cause". Abu Musab promised in an interview with al-Naba that he would not target mosques or markets in northern Nigeria. The difference in these approaches is due to Barnawi considering the general population in the region to be Muslim whereas Shekau considered them to be non-believers. On 27 February 2018, he was made a 'Specially Designated National' by the United States Office of Foreign Assets Control.

In March 2019, rumours began to circulate according to which Abu Musab had been replaced by Abu Abdullah Idris ibn Umar al-Barnawi as the governor of ISWAP. Neither the Islamic State's top leadership, nor members of its West Africa branch officially commented on the claims, resulting in speculations about the reported dismissal. Some argued that he had possibly been overthrown as part of an internal power struggle, while the Multinational Joint Task Force (MJTF) claimed that he had been fired by the Islamic State's top command due to a number of defeats of his forces at the hands of MJTF. Later research by the Crisis Group concluded that Abu Musab had stepped down after being challenged by other ISWAP senior commanders who considered him too young for a leader. The Islamic State central command never officially accepted Abu Musab's removal from his position.

Around mid-May 2021, ISWAP released an audio declaring that Abu Musab al-Barnawi had been reinstated by the IS central command as "caretaker" leader of ISWAP. With Abu Musab restored to overall command, ISWAP proceeded to overrun Sambisa Forest, inflicting a major defeat on the Shekau faction and resulting in Abubakar Shekau's death. Al-Barnawi consequently declared Boko Haram dissolved, and Shekau dead, condemning him as "someone who committed unimaginable terrorism". Soon after, ISWAP's structure was reformed, and Abu Musab was appointed head of the ISWAP's shura (a powerful consultative assembly) and commander of Sambisa Forest. According to the Daily Trust newspaper, he was killed in August 2021. Different accounts of his death circulated, alleging that he had either been killed by the Nigerian Army or as a result of inter-ISWAP power struggles. It was confirmed by ISWAP sources that Abu Musab had been wounded in a clash with Boko Haram loyalists around this time, though Islamic State members did not comment on the allegations of his death.

The accuracy of the claim of Abu Musab's death was questioned by Crisis Group and Humangle Media researchers who gathered "multiple sources" suggesting that Abu Musab had disappeared due to being promoted. According to Humangle Media journalist Aliyu Dahiru, one source reported that Abu Musab al-Barnawi was "well and alive" as of 2022. As per these claims, Abu Musab had actually been appointed to IS central's global shura (advisory) council and was involved in coordinating IS operations beyond the Chad Basin. This report was mirrored by interviews by Crisis Group researchers with ISWAP members who stated that Abu Musab had been given a "larger, though unspecified, African mandate" as he was recovering from a wound.

References

Works cited

Further reading
 Choosing a Figurehead Over a Fanatic: A Profile of Abu Musab al-Barnawi, the New Leader of the Islamic State in West Africa (subscription required)
 Boko Haram's Nemesis: A Post-Mortem of Islamic State in West Africa Province (ISWAP) Leader, Abu Musab al-Barnawi (subscription required)

Year of birth missing
Place of birth missing
Nigerian Muslims
Boko Haram members
Islamic State of Iraq and the Levant members
Leaders of Islamic terror groups